Forest Home Historic District is a national historic district located at Forest Home in Tompkins County, New York. The district consists of 66 contributing buildings, four contributing sites (three bridges and a dam), and two contributing sites (archaeological remains of former grist mills).  The historic building stock consists primarily of one- to two-story frame dwellings on relatively small, irregularly shaped lots.

It was listed on the National Register of Historic Places in 1998.

References

External links

Historic districts on the National Register of Historic Places in New York (state)
Archaeological sites in New York (state)
Historic districts in Tompkins County, New York
National Register of Historic Places in Tompkins County, New York